Hsu Ching-chung (19 July 1907 – 13 March 1996) was a Taiwanese politician. He was the Vice Premier of the Republic of China from 1972 to 1981. And Acting Premier of the Republic of China in 1978

Early life
Born in Taipei in 1907, Hsu was of Hakka ancestry from Jiaoling, Meizhou, Guangdong, China. He graduated from Taihoku Imperial University.

Political careers
Hsu was the Minister of the Interior in 1966–1972 and Vice Premier in 1972–1981.

Death
Hsu died in 1996.

References

Taiwanese Ministers of the Interior
1907 births
1996 deaths
Taiwanese politicians of Hakka descent
People from Jiaoling
Kuomintang politicians in Taiwan
National Taiwan University alumni